The second season of the Tyler Perry's House of Payne began airing on June 6, 2007, and concluded on August 6, 2008. The season contained 100 episodes.

Cast

Main cast 
 LaVan Davis as Curtis Payne
 Cassi Davis as Ella Payne
 Lance Gross as Calvin Payne
 Allen Payne as Clarence James (C.J.) Payne, Jr.
 Larramie "Doc" Shaw as Malik Payne
 China Anne McClain as Jazmine Payne
 Demetria McKinney as Janine Payne
 Denise Burse as Claretha Jenkins
 Keisha Knight Pulliam as Miranda Lucas (episodes 72-100, guest star in episode 25)

Recurring cast 
 Joyce Giraud as Angel O. Reilz
 Bart Hansard as Bart Holmes
 Cedric Pendleton as Keenan Jared
 Robinne Lee as Nicole Jamieson
 Kyre Batiste-Loftin as Kevin
 Quincy Bonds as Pookie
 Clayton English as Peanut
 Eva Marcille as Tracie
 Robin Givens as Tanya

Guest stars 
 David Mann as Mr. Brown
 George Wallace as Jimmy
 Daniele Gaither as Smokey
 Lisa Arrindell Anderson as Dr. Gilrest
 Tyler Perry as Madea
 Keke Palmer as Nikki
 Tamela Mann as Cora Brown
 Lamman Rucker as Will Brown

Episodes

Ratings
The first two episodes premiered with 5.2 and 5.8 million viewers.

Home release
The season's first 20 episodes were released on the Volume 1 DVD on December 4, 2007. The season's final 17 episodes were released on the Volume 2 DVD on July 1, 2008.

References

External links
 
 Tyler Perry's "House of Payne" on TBS

Tyler Perry's House of Payne seasons
2007 American television seasons
2008 American television seasons